Fox News Radio is an American radio network owned by Fox News. It is syndicated to over 500 AM and FM radio stations across the United States. It also supplies programming for three channels on Sirius XM Satellite Radio.

History 
In 2003, Fox News began syndicating one-minute radio updates to radio stations via syndication service Westwood One.  With the success of the one-minute updates, Fox opted to make a full foray into network radio news services and began hiring a staff of 60 radio professionals.

On June 1, 2005, Fox News Radio began providing hourly five-minute newscasts at the beginning of each hour and a one-minute newscast at the half-hour mark. At its launch, 60 stations were signed up for the network. Many more joined under a deal struck between Fox and Clear Channel Communications (now iHeartMedia), the largest owner of radio stations in America. This allowed many Clear Channel stations to carry Fox News Radio newscasts and allowed Fox News Radio to use and nationally distribute news content produced by Clear Channel.  Several of those stations ended decades-long relationships dating back to the Golden Age of Radio with CBS Radio News and ABC News Radio to carry Fox News Radio.

Fox also produces Fox News Talk, a long-form network with conservative talk programs featuring Fox News personalities. The programs are broadcast on terrestrial radio stations in the United States as well as a dedicated channel on SiriusXM Satellite Radio's digital platform on Channel 450. Channel 450 also carries the five-minute Fox Newscast at the start of each hour and the one-minute Fox News update at 30 minutes after each hour.

In late 2015, Fox News Radio began offering Fox News Headlines 24/7 exclusively to SiriusXM subscribers on Channel 115.  It's a live-anchored all news channel with a dedicated editorial staff, providing a panorama of the day's news "from Hollywood to Wall Street to Main Street."
 News is presented in fifteen-minute blocks.  Six anchors each day are assigned to eight-hour air shifts, with one hour on and one hour off over the course of the shift. Additional features include sports at :05/:35, business at :12/:42 and entertainment news at :28/:58. The station does not suspend its format for breaking news coverage, which is the role of Fox News Channel. The slogans are "The news you want, the moment you want it" and "It's news, ready when you are". It is a companion channel to the audio simulcasts of the Fox News Channel on SiriusXM 114 and Fox Business on SiriusXM 113.

Newscasts 
The Fox News Radio Network provides around-the-clock newscasts at the beginning of each hour and at 30 minutes past the hour. Depending on a station's affiliation, it either receives a five-minute newscast at the beginning of each hour or a one-minute newscast which runs at the beginning of the hour or at 30 minutes after the hour. Breaking news reports (dubbed 'Fox News Alerts'), business news updates, correspondent and expert interviews, special broadcasts marking historic or newsworthy events, anchored live coverage and clean feeds of news events complete the affiliate service package. Affiliates also have access to a web site with a constantly updating selection of newsmaker audio and correspondent reports.

The five minute audio version of the hourly newscast consists of two minutes of news, one minute of advertisements or Fox promotions and two more minutes of news. In February 2017 the audio version eliminated the commercial break at the two-minute mark, so that the newscast ran for only four minutes. The commercial minute was restored in May 2017, returning it to a five-minute newscast. It is available as a podcast. As of 2011, typically only one MP3 file, the most recent one, is available at any time. The Eastern Time hour number converted to 24-hour time is incorporated into the file name (for example, 5minpodcast21.mp3 for 9pm). However, if there has been exceptional news (a "Fox News Alert"), the file for that hour's podcast will be retained for a few hours. The current hour's file is usually available within 10 minutes of its broadcast, i.e., by a quarter past the hour.

Newscasts are regularly anchored by Dave Anthony, Lisa Brady, Joe Chiaro, Lisa Lacerra, Chris Foster, Pam Puso, Rich Denison, Paul Stevens, Jack Callaghan, Kerin McCue, Pat O'Neill, Carmen Roberts, Lilian Woo, Steve Rappoport, and Chris DeMeo. Correspondents include Gurnal Scott and Tonya J. Powers in New York City; Jared Halpern (Capitol Hill), Sean Langille and Rachel Sutherland in Washington, D.C.; Jessica Rosenthal and entertainment reporter Michelle Pollino in Los Angeles; Jeff Monosso reports from Chicago and Eben Brown reports from Miami. Foreign correspondents include Simon Owen and Kitty Logan in London; Courtney Walsh in Rome; and Alastair Wanklyn in Tokyo.  Hilarie Barsky and Ginny Kosola are business news reporters. Jared Max and Matt Napolitano are sports news reporters.

Talk Programming 
Fox News Radio syndicates the following weekday talk radio programs:
 The Brian Kilmeade Show (9a.m. to 12p.m. E.T.)
 Fox Across America with Jimmy Failla (12p.m. to 3p.m. E.T.)
 The Guy Benson Show (3p.m. to 6p.m. E.T.)

In June 2017, Fox News Radio re-organized its talk show line up. After over a decade as "Kilmeade and Friends," the 9a.m. show was re-branded as "The Brian Kilmeade Show."  The noon show, which had been hosted by John Gibson, was turned over to Todd Starnes. The 3p.m. show, which had been hosted by Tom Sullivan, was turned over to Tom Shillue. Sullivan continues on his flagship Sacramento radio stations KFBK and KFBK-FM, and affiliates via syndication by Talk Media Network.

Alan Colmes, who hosted the 6p.m. to 9p.m. slot, died unexpectedly on February 23, 2017.

On May 7, 2018, a new program Benson & Harf debuted from 6p.m. to 8p.m.; it was discontinued in May 2019 when Harf left Fox News Radio and Guy Benson replaced Tom Shillue as host of the 3p.m. show.

Todd Starnes provided weekday commentaries and hosted the 12p.m. to 3p.m. show from July 2017 until October 2019 when he was fired by Fox News for remarks made during a Fox Nation discussion in which Starnes agreed with a guest that Democrats worship Moloch, an ancient demon god. Starnes' 12p.m. to 3p.m. program was replaced by the Fox Across America program which had a variety of hosts, until March 9, 2020 when Jimmy Failla was named the permanent host of the show.

During prime time hours, the AM/FM syndicated version of Fox News Radio carries the audio from Fox News Channel's commentary programs (The Five, Tucker Carlson Tonight, Hannity and The Ingraham Angle) on a delay.  The SiriusXM version of the Fox News Talk offers these feeds live on Sirius XM channel 114, so the Sirius XM Channel 450 feed instead carries repeats of Fox News Talk's daytime radio shows. Repeats of weekday shows also air over the weekend, along with several once-a-week talk shows, including I'll Tell You What with Dana Perino and Chris Stirewalt, and From Washington with Jared Halpern, and Fox News Sunday.

On September 4, 2019, SiriusXM and Fox News announced a long-term extension of their broadcast agreement for Fox News Channel, Fox Business Network, and Fox News Headlines 24/7 Channel to continue to be distributed via SiriusXM. The agreement also included Fox News primetime programming to be made available on-demand via SiriusXM and Pandora.

On June 8, 2020, Fox News Media and SiriusXM announced the rollout of their planned expansion, with all Fox News Podcasts’ original programming now being available via Pandora. Additionally, the platform’s daily one hour morning news radio program, The Fox News Rundown, is now airing weekday mornings on the SiriusXM Patriot Channel 125.

See also 
 Fox News
 Radio broadcasting
 Radio in the United States

References

External links 
 
 5 Minute Newscast Podcast (updated hourly)

Fox News
Radio stations established in 2003
American radio networks
Sirius XM Radio channels
Podcasting companies